Mirriam is the fifth studio album released by American country artist, Jessi Colter. It was issued in July 1977 on Capitol Records.

Background 
Colter's fifth album was derived from her birth name, Mirriam Johnson. The album consisted of ten new tracks, all of which were written by Colter. The album's lead single, "I Belong to Him" (which featured Waylon Jennings and Roy Orbison), was the only song released from the album, and did not chart on the Hot Country Songs or the Billboard Hot 100 charts upon its release. In addition, the album peaked at #29 the Top Country Albums chart, becoming Colter's first studio album to chart outside of the Top 10. Mirriam was produced by Ken Mansfield (the producer of Colter's previous three releases under Capitol) and Richie Albright.

The album did not gain many positive reviews from music critics and magazines. Allmusic.com reviewed the album, and gave it two and a half out of five stars.

Track listing 
All tracks composed by Jessi Colter.
 "For Mama" – 3:11
 "Put Your Arms Around Me" – 3:11
 "I Belong to Him" – 4:04
 featuring Waylon Jennings and Roy Orbison
 "God if I Could Only Write Your Love Song" – 3:02
 "Consider Me" – 3:45
 "There Ain't No Rain" – 2:34
 "God I Love You" – 3:02
 "Let it Go" – 2:53
 "Master, Master" – 2:59
 "New Wine" – 3:44

Personnel 
Jessi Colter - keyboards, lead vocals
 Richie Albright – drums, producer
 Johnny Christopher – guitar
 Jim Gordon – horn
 Sherman Hayes – bass
 Dick Hyde – trombone
 Waylon Jennings – backing vocals on "I Belong to Him", guitar
 Mackinley Johnson – trumpet
 Gayle Lavant – harp
 G. Merlin – dulcimer
 Ralph Mooney – steel guitar
 Roy Orbison – backing vocals on "I Belong to Him"
 Gordon Payne – guitar
 Clifford "Barny" Robertson – backing vocals, keyboards
 Carter Robertson – backing vocals
 Rance Wasson – guitar
 Toni Wine - backing vocals on "Let It Go"
Technical
 Chips Moman, Don Cobb, Jake Hottell, Richie Albright - engineers
 Roy Kohara - art direction

Charts
Album – Billboard (North America)

Singles - Billboard (United States)

References

External links

1977 albums
Jessi Colter albums
Capitol Records albums